Mind Performance Hacks: Tips and Tools for Overclocking Your Brain is a self-help book using psychology and mnemonic techniques to improve thinking skills such as memory, creativity, mental math, and other cognitive abilities by Ron Hale-Evans, who wrote and researched approximately 80% of the book material. It is also notable in its use of Perl programming scripts to supplement a few of the hacks. Inspired by the Mentat Wiki, also created by Ron Hale-Evans, the book was published by O'Reilly Media in February 2006 as part of the O'Reilly Hacks series. It is considered an unofficial sequel to the earlier Mind Hacks.

Content 

Chapter 1 - Memory
Includes detailed instruction on how to memorize lists of items, mnemonic techniques to remember large amounts of data, and retrieving memories.

Chapter 2 - Information Processing
Includes how to capture creative ideas, mapping your thoughts, and managing mental clutter.

Chapter 3 - Creativity
Includes brainstorming ideas, working with constraints, memetics, dream recall, and other creativity enhancers.

Chapter 4 - Math
How to perform mental arithmetic, and performing large calculations without a calculator.

Chapter 5 - Decision Making
How to foresee important problems, figuring out dominant strategies, and when it's safe to roll the dice.

Chapter 6 - Communication
Overcoming stage fright, learning artificial languages,  and more ideas on effective communicating.

Chapter 7 - Clarity
Includes recognizing and controlling complex emotions, avoiding cognitive distortions, and using meditation and hypnosis.

Chapter 8 - Mental Fitness
On how to maintain a healthy brain, via mental warmups, playing board games, getting adequate sleep and nutrition, and assembling a mental toolbox.

References

External links
Official O'Reilly Mind Performance Hacks website
The Mentat Wiki which inspired the book
Ron Hale-Evan's web page

2006 non-fiction books
O'Reilly Media books
Self-help books